Chintaman Raghunath Vyas (9 November 1924 – 10 January 2002), popularly known as C. R. Vyas, was an Indian classical singer. He was known for singing khyal style.

Early life
Vyas was born in Osmanabad, Maharashtra, into a family of Sanskrit scholars and Hari kirtankars. He was influenced by the singing of his father and grandfather, episodes from Ramayan and Mahabharata.

He had his initial music training from Govindrao Bhatambrekar of the Kirana gharana for a decade. Then he learnt from Rajarambua Paradkar of Gwalior. While he was training in the Gwalior style of singing, he was impressed by Jagannathbuwa Purohit who belonged to the Agra gharana and started learning from him. He also got guidance from Yeshwantbuva Mirashi. He also benefited from association with other scholars/musicians, namely S N Ratanjankar, Chidanand Nagarkar, S.C.R. Bhat and K. G. Ginde.

Career
C. R. Vyas had an open-throated voice and sang a blend of all the different gharanas he was trained in, but the influence of the Gwalior gayaki is quite prominent.

He had been employed at ITC in a white collar job. Music was not a primary vocation. In his own words, "In our time we did not think of earning either fame or money through music". He was a leading artist in AIR and on TV. He has participated in major musical events in India as well as abroad.

Among his disciples are Shripad Paradkar (son of his own guru Legendary Gwalior gharana vocalist Pt Rajarambua Paradkar), Prabhakar Karekar, Sriram Parasuram, Sanjeev Chimmalgi, Ganapati Bhat and his son Suhas Vyas. Jitendra Abhisheki was his student for almost ten years.

Personal life
He was married to Smt Indira Vyas. They have three sons-Suhas Vyas, a veteran classical vocalist himself, Satish Vyas, prominent Santoor Player and Shashi Vyas, a Chartered Accountant by profession and now the Managing Director of Pancham Nishad, the leading most event management/organising company of Classical Music.

He also researched traditional ragas and bandishes and composed more than 200 bandishes in different ragas under the pen-name Gunijaan. As a tribute to his Guru Gunidas he started the Gunidas Sangeet Sammelan  in 1977. He has written a book Raag Sarita which sums up his work in the field of music. The updated edition of the book was recently released in 2019 by his son Suhas Vyas.

Awards and recognition
 Tansen Sanman by Government of Madhya Pradesh in 1999
  Master Dinanath Mangeshkar Puraskar in 1999
 Marathwada Gaurav Puraskar in 1998
 Ustad Hafiz Ali Khan Award in 1994
 Padma Bhushan in 1992
 Maharashtra Gaurav Puraskar in 1990
 Sangeet Natak Akademi Award in 1987

Discography
 Etched in Time — Pandit C. R. Vyas (VCD — Released in 2007)
 Tapasya — Vol 1 & 2 (2005) This album features Live recordings of Pandit Jasraj, Bhimsen Joshi & Vyas
 Sangeet Sartaj - C R Vyas (Vocal) This double volume album will feature the great Hindustani classical vocalist Vyas. The maestro has rendered in this album ragas like Bihag, Bimpalasi and Ahiri Lalit to name a few.
 Eternal Rhapsody - C R Vyas Live Recording In Mumbai

References

https://www.hindustantimes.com/pune-news/fan-of-classical-music-raag-sarita-2-0-is-your-chance-to-grab-original-compositions-by-vocalist-pandit-cr-vyas-in-pune-on-feb-9/story-C4HNJmkiCnuZNaeAe602gL.html

https://punemirror.indiatimes.com/entertainment/unwind/the-river-flows-on/articleshow/67872673.cms

1924 births
2002 deaths
Hindustani singers
Recipients of the Padma Bhushan in arts
Recipients of the Sangeet Natak Akademi Award
People from Osmanabad
People from Marathwada
20th-century Indian singers
Singers from Maharashtra